The Vancouver Fire Department provides fire protection and emergency medical services to the city of Vancouver and, by contract, Clark County Fire District 5, in Washington. The Vancouver Fire Department is chronically understaffed and underfunded- it has the dubious distinction of the highest call volume per firefighter in the state. ALS (Advanced Life Support, or paramedic staffed) transport is provided by AMR, making Vancouver Fire's service area population by far the largest in Western Washington without public ALS ambulance service. (see Medic One)

History

The Vancouver Fire Department (VFD) was officially founded on January 1, 1867, when an ordinance was passed by the City Council organizing a fire department for the city. The motivation for the formation of the department came in August 1866 when a fire started in a furniture store and, in less than an hour, destroyed eight buildings.

Operations

Fire and EMS Response
An engine company is the standard multi-purpose response resource for each VFD first-due zone (station area). Engines carry water, hose, a full complement of emergency medical equipment, as well as a variety of other tools and equipment.

VFD has 2 truck companies (aka ladder trucks) that are housed alongside engine companies. VFD truck companies carry a full complement of ground ladders and a 100 ft. aerial ladder, along with other structure-fire-specific tools. They are also the primary technical rescue companies, carrying patient extrication equipment, forcible entry equipment, and other special equipment. Both VFD trucks are tractor-drawn aerials (TDAs) and do not carry water. They are the only fully-staffed truck companies in all of Clark County.

VFD engine companies are staffed 24/7 with 3 members minimum, and truck companies are staffed with 4 members minimum. Each engine company and truck company is supervised by a Captain (who is counted as part of the 3 or 4 person unit) For some of each day, Vancouver also operates one part-time 2-person ALS rescue (an SUV unit; in-service status varies with day of week, shift staffing and time of day). Staff for rescue does not impact minimum engine and truck staffing, and is not counted in minimum daily staffing. 
 
All VFD engine companies and truck companies are Advanced Life Support (ALS) units. Every firefighter, Captain and Battalion Chief is certified to either the EMT-Basic or EMT-Paramedic level. The department's daily minimum on-duty staffing is 43, including 2 BCs. [but not including rescue SUV(s)] 
More than 80% of the department's annual call volume is EMS-related. Because of the geographic distribution of VFD fire stations (usually affording far quicker response times than AMR), the fire companies provide primary ALS treatment until the AMR transport unit arrives.

All staffed VFD companies (and most of the other fire companies in Clark County) are dispatched via AVL (Automatic Vehicle Location), a GPS-based feature of the regional computer-aided dispatch (CAD) system. The closest company(s) of a CAD-recommended type is automatically sent to an incident, regardless of jurisdiction. (CRESA 911 is the PSAP and dispatch agency for the VFD, the remainder of Clark County, and portions of Cowlitz and Skamania Counties)

Vancouver's heavy rescue, hazardous materials, fire boat, rehab and air units,  as well as all water tenders and brush engines, are not normally staffed. They can be cross-staffed by their co-housed engine or truck crew when needed. (Exception- Fireboat 1 is housed several miles distant from Engine 3, the company that responds to staff it, when they are available) 
 
The combined City of Vancouver/Fire District 5 response area is split into two geographic battalions (Battalion 1: East, Battalion 2: West). Each battalion is managed by a Battalion Chief (BC) working a 24/48 schedule. At present, each BC supervises 5 or 6 stations and their respective companies.

A Battalion Chief (BC) serves as the incident commander (IC) for all complex, multi-company operations. Both BCs respond to every structure fire incident to fill IC and other roles. A BC also normally responds with Vancouver companies that are dispatched to complex incidents outside of the VFD response area. They provide additional command staff assistance at those incidents. 

For very large incidents, the VFD can request the Vancouver Police Department (VPD) mobile command post unit. VPD's acquisition of this unit allowed the VFD to discontinue maintenance and operation of its own command post unit.

Specialty Teams
Technical Rescue: Heavy Rescue 5 and a Clark Co. FD 6 multi-purpose vehicle (TRT 61) make up the Clark County Technical Rescue Team fleet. The team is composed of members from both departments, as well as from other agencies within Clark County. HR5 can be cross-staffed by members of E5 and/or T5 (when available) for initial deployment. This team is a regional asset.

Hazardous Materials: Engine 10 serves as the on-duty HazMat company for emergency consultation (in addition to its normal fire/EMS duties). The special-purpose HazMat 10 unit is not staffed, but is usually part of a team deployment. The team must be assembled for a full mobilization, with members often coming from home (paged off-duty). This can take 1 hour or more. This team is a regional asset.

Fireboat

In May 2014, the VFD put into service the Discovery, a  quick response fireboat. This vessel was specially designed for all-season fire and rescue duty on the ColumbIa River. It can operate in very shallow water, and can beach itself like a landing craft when necessary. The fireboat was paid for through a port security grant from the Federal Emergency Management Agency.  Normally FEMA matches funds raised locally on a three to one basis, but, in Vancouver's case, FEMA waived the requirement for a local contribution to the capital costs, and paid the entire $1.6 million costs itself.

Labor Groups
Firefighters and Captains are represented by the "Vancouver Firefighters Local 452" of the International Association of Firefighters.

Battalion Chiefs and Division Chiefs are represented by the "Vancouver Fire Command Officers Local 4378" of the International Association of Firefighters

Fire Prevention personnel (all civilian), are currently represented by the “Vancouver Fire Department Guild.”

Stations and apparatus

Museum
The Vancouver Fire Department Museum lost its facility in the late 1990s. Most of the museum's historic artifacts, including apparatus, are in storage. However, the public may view a 1925 Seagrave engine and some equipment in a view-from-outside museum display at Fire Station 10. No entry to the display area interior is allowed- please do not disturb the on-duty crew. The VFD has two other fully restored apparatus; a 1934 Seagrave engine, and the VFD's original Hunneman hand pumper. None of Vancouver's steam fire engines remain in the department's possession.

Pipe Band
The "Vancouver Firefighters Pipes and Drums" band was formed in 2009. It is sponsored by IAFF Local 452, but raises operational funding through donations. The band receives no fire department funding or support. The band's core purpose is to honor fallen firefighters and other public servants at memorials and other events. The band is regional in nature, with members from Vancouver FD, Clark Co. Fire District 6, Chehalis FD and Olympia FD. Membership is open to active duty and retired members of the region's fire and law enforcement agencies. Oct 2022 NOTE: Status of the band remains "inactive" since onset of the pandemic.

References

Vancouver, Washington
Fire departments in Washington (state)